Moskowitz Prize for Zionism, established by Irving and Cherna Moskowitz, is given for activity in realization of Zionism, as it is comprehended by the Moskowitzes. The Prize has been granted every year since 2008 to three winners in a ceremony which takes place on Jerusalem Day, in the City of David. The prize extent to each winner is US$50,000.

The prize founder, billionaire Irving Moskowitz is an American businessman and a right activist who supports Israeli settlements in the West Bank. On the prize judge committee chair stands his wife Cherna Moskowitz. The members of the committee are public personalities from Israel and abroad, whom amongst are Avigdor Kahalani and Moshe Arens. Yisrael Aumann serves as a special advisor of the prize committee.

The Declared Aim of the Prize:

Listed below are recipients of the main prize, known as the "Lion of Zion" award. Another award, called "Spirit of Zion", was given to several individuals between the years 2013-2016, "for new initiatives, [to] young Israelis with vision who recognize the need to stand up and be counted. "

Winners

References

External links
 Official website
 Ruthi Liberman, both Zionism and Settling, nrg, 24.3.2009 - Headmistress of Moskowitz Prize for Zionism present considerations for prize granting
 Uzi Baruch, Also this year: Moskowitz Prize for Zionism, Channel 7

 
Lists of Israeli award winners